Ring of Darkness is a 2004 fantasy horror film directed by David DeCoteau and starring Ryan Starr, Matt T. Baker, and Adrienne Barbeau.

Although never released into American theaters, the movie was released worldwide, and translated into several languages other than English, such as French, Spanish, Italian and German.

Plot summary
The lead singer of boy band 'Take 10' vanishes. The band--which is secretly composed of zombie cannibals--conducts an American Idol type contest to find a replacement.

Cast
 Colin Bain as B.J.
 Matt T. Baker	as Jake
 Adrienne Barbeau as Alex
 Greg Cipes as Gordo
 Eric Dearborn	as Max
 Jaclyn Gutierrez as Female assistant
 Josh Hammond as Lousy contestant
 Jonathan McDaniel as Coordinator
 Jeremy Jackson as Xavier
 Stephen Martines as Shawn
 Jeff Peterson as Jonah
 Margarita Reyes as Rebecca
 Ryan Starr as Stacy
 Mink Stole as Fletcher
 Irina Voronina as Amethyst
 Suzanne Whang as Television Reporter
 John Wynn as Kyle
 Jon Prutow as 1950's Boy Band Member
 Jamisin Matthews as 1980s New Wave band member
 Delno Ebie as 1950's Boy Band Member
 Michael Haboush as 1980s Band Member
 Murray SawChuck as 1980s Rock Roll Singer (Flashback)
 James Townsend as 1950's Boy Band Member

Production 
Filming for Ring of Darkness was completed in eight days, based on a script Ryan Carassi, Matthew Jason Walsh, and Fangoria editor Michael Gingold. Per DeCoteau, the film's premise had initially been completely different.

Adrienne Barbeau's character Alex was initially been written for a man and DeCoteau had wanted the role filled by either Antonio Sabato, Jr. or Dolph Lundgren. The choice was made to make Alex a woman and Barbeau was brought in to portray the character.

Reception 
Ring of Darkness was reviewed by both Felix Vasquez Jr. of Cinema Crazed and Jon Condit of Dread Central, both criticizing the film for its acting and plot.

Per Darren Elliott-Smith, Ring of Darkness, along with  DeCoteau's The Brotherhood and Ancient Evil: The Legend of the Mummy II, is an example of the reactionary "coming out" narrative where "the 'Newcomer' can be read as a sexually confused individual who is attracted by the erotic allure of the 'Monster group' who are coded as queer".

References

External links
 

2004 horror films
2004 films
American zombie films
Films directed by David DeCoteau
2000s English-language films
2000s American films